Manchester Township is the name of some places in the U.S. state of Pennsylvania:

Manchester Township, Wayne County, Pennsylvania
Manchester Township, York County, Pennsylvania

See also 
 East Manchester Township, York County, Pennsylvania
 West Manchester Township, York County, Pennsylvania
 Manchester Township (disambiguation)

Pennsylvania township disambiguation pages